GSHHG (Global Self-consistent, Hierarchical, High-resolution Geography Database; formerly Global Self-consistent, Hierarchical, High-resolution Shoreline Database (GSHHS)) is a high-resolution shoreline data set amalgamated from two data bases (the CIA world database WDBII, and the World Vector Shoreline database) in the public domain. The data have undergone extensive processing and are free of internal inconsistencies such as erratic points and crossing segments. The shorelines are constructed entirely from hierarchically arranged closed polygons. The four-level hierarchy is as follows: seashore, lakes, islands within lakes, ponds within islands within lakes.

The data can be used to simplify data searches and data selections, or to study the statistical characteristics of shorelines and land-masses. It comes with access software and routines to facilitate decimation based on a standard line-reduction algorithm.

GSHHS is developed and maintained by Dr. Paul Wessel at the University of Hawai'i, and Dr. Walter H. F. Smith at the NOAA Laboratory for Satellite Altimetry.

See also 
Vector Map, a vector based collection of GIS data covering the earth

References

External links 
 http://www.soest.hawaii.edu/pwessel/gshhg/ (Version 2.3.7 as of June 15, 2017)
 http://www.ngdc.noaa.gov/mgg/shorelines/gshhs.html

This article contains public domain text created by the U.S. Federal government, taken from the NOAA website at 

Maps
Geographical technology